Eriosyce laui is a species of cactus. It has been treated as a synonym of Islaya laui, and the species  has also been placed in a separate genus, Rimacactus, as its sole species Rimacactus laui. The genus is recognized by other sources.

References

Cactoideae